Telus Harbour, formerly Telus House, formerly Union Tower, is a 30-storey office skyscraper at 25 York Street, on the south side of the traditionally defined financial district of Toronto, Ontario, Canada.  Anchor tenant Telus will occupy 60 percent of the rentable area.

Location

The building is located at the corner of York Street and Bremner Boulevard, the former brownfield railway lands, just south of Union Station.  Telus Tower is connected to the Toronto PATH network of underground pedestrian passageways. The building is visible from the Toronto Waterfront and is one of the many new developments in the area, including the Scotiabank Arena, Maple Leaf Square, and Infinity Condominium.

Sustainable design
The development is pursuing Leadership in Energy and Environmental Design (LEED) gold status for the project's environmental sustainability.

Tenants

 Telus
 Dye & Durham
 President's Choice Financial (President's Choice Bank)

See also
 Toronto Harbour

References

External links
 
 Menkes Official Page
 Telus Release
 Toronto Star coverage of worker death

Leadership in Energy and Environmental Design basic silver certified buildings
Office buildings completed in 2009
PATH (Toronto)
Skyscrapers in Toronto
Skyscraper office buildings in Canada
Telus